Eyemouth is a small town and civil parish in Berwickshire, in the Scottish Borders area of Scotland.

The town's name comes from its location at the mouth of the Eye Water river. The Berwickshire coastline consists of high cliffs over deep clear water with sandy coves and picturesque harbours. A fishing port, Eyemouth holds a yearly Herring Queen Festival. Notable buildings in the town include Gunsgreen House and a cemetery watch-house built to stand guard against the Resurrectionists (body snatchers). Many of the features of a traditional fishing village are preserved in the narrow streets and 'vennels'.

Eyemouth is not far from the small villages of Ayton, Reston, St Abbs, Coldingham, and Burnmouth, all in Berwickshire.

The coast offers opportunities for birdwatching, walking, fishing and diving. Accommodation includes several hotels, B&Bs and a holiday park.

History

Fort Point, Eyemouth, was the site of the first trace-italienne-style fortification in Britain. Building commenced in 1547 by Sir Richard Lee (1513–1575) and it cost £1,906. It was demolished under the Treaty of Boulogne in 1550. Rebuilt again six years later by d'Oisel and the Italian military engineer Lorenzo Pomarelli, it held some 500 French troops. It was demolished again under the Treaty of Cateau-Cambresis in 1559. Traces of the ramparts are still to be seen.

Eyemouth fell within the feudal barony of Coldingham, possessed until the early 17th century by Coldingham Priory, after which it passed to the Home family, who had held lands in that barony since at least the 15th century. All landowners (portioners) within the barony held their properties either by hereditary feu or by a term-renewable, occasionally hereditary, tack (Scots word for a lease) from the barony.

The lands between the southern banks of the Eye Water consisted of three estates: Gunsgreen, immediately opposite Eyemouth and Netherbyres, once part of the larger lands of Flemington which stretched all the way to Lamberton. At the beginning of the 17th century Gunsgreen estate was possessed by Alexander Lauder of Gunsgreen, a great-great-grandson of Sir Robert Lauder of The Bass (d.1508). On 17 January 1629, Alexander Lauder of Gunsgreen, acting as bailie for Sir David Home of Wedderburn, gave a sasine to Andrew Gray in Eyemouth, of some land on the boundaries of Houndlaw and also in Eyemouth.

Netherbyres was for at least 250 years held by the Craw (originally Auchincraw) family. "George Craw of Netherbyre" was "deceased" by July 1614 when his son William came into possession of that property and Reidhall, "with the walk mill" extending to 12 husbandlands. A later William Craw, who had a passion for mathematics, built the first 'modern' harbour at Eyemouth and, in 1715, the elliptical walled garden, the latter almost certainly unique in the world. The Netherbyres House we see today was commenced about 1835 for Captain Sir Samuel Brown, R.N., who had the patent and monopoly for the supply of anchor chain to the Royal Navy. He later went on to design and patent chain suspension piers and bridges, including the Union Bridge over the River Tweed, still in use today. Netherbyres House was bought by Sir Christopher Furness, 2nd Bt. in 1928, and was donated to Gardeners' Royal Benevolent Society for charitable use by his second son Colonel Simon Furness, the Vice Lord Lieutenant for Berwickshire, who now occupies a house overlooking the walled garden.
Hero William Spears (1812–1885), is celebrated by the dramatic bronze statue in Eyemouth Market Place, where he stands pointing the way to Ayton, the scene of his peaceful demonstration. Spears led a revolt against the tithes on fish levied by the Church of Scotland, even after the great Disruption of 1843 when most fishermen left the established Church to join other congregations.

Very soon after the cost of getting the tithes removed had been met, the town was struck by the Eyemouth Disaster when, on 14 October 1881, most of the fishing fleet, some 20 boats and 129 men from the town, were lost in a terrible storm. Including victims from other coastal towns, a total of 189 men lost their lives. This is commemorated in the Eyemouth Tapestry housed in the Museum.

A contemporary article offers an interesting insight into Eyemouth in the 1860s:
"Between St Abbs Head and Berwick, however is situated Eyemouth, a fishing village pure and simple, with all that wonderful
filth scattered about which is a sanitary peculiarity of such towns.

The population of Eyemouth is in keeping with the outward appearance of the place. As a whole, they are rough, uncultivated,
and more drunken in their habits than the fishermen of the neighbouring villages. Coldingham Shore, for instance, is only
three miles distant, and has a population of about one hundred fishermen, of a very respectable class, sober and well dressed,
and "well to do." – The Fisher Folk of the Scottish East Coast, "Macmillian's Magazine" No.36 October 1862.

In the late 18th century with the arrival of a group of Dutch engineers in the town, a survey was undertaken for a canal linking Eyemouth to Duns. The plan would have involved damming the Whiteadder Water at Chirnside thus diverting the course of the Whiteadder Water through the low-lying area known as Billiemire to join the Eye Water near Ayton. The plan was never carried out.

The line was forced to close from August 1948 to June 1949 after being damaged by the flooding of the Eye Water.
John Churchill, 1st Duke of Marlborough was created Baron Eyemouth, in the Peerage of Scotland, in 1682. This was the first of his peerage titles.

Transport
The A1 road, the main Edinburgh – Newcastle route, puts the town within commuting distance of Edinburgh.

Eyemouth railway station served the town until it was closed in 1962. The nearest railway station is Reston railway station. The  253 operated by Borders Buses and the 34 operated by Travelsure.

Education
Eyemouth Public School, in Albert Road, was built in 1876, designed by the architect William Gray Junior.

Children attend Eyemouth Primary School, after which they attend Eyemouth High School.

There is a further education training centre in the town. Northumberland College in Berwick-upon-Tweed is eight miles (13 km) away and full-time further and higher education courses are offered at Borders College and Heriot-Watt University's textiles campus in Galashiels.

Harbour and industry

In 1997, Eyemouth was given EU funding from a scheme to regenerate declining fishing villages and raised matching funds itself to construct a deep water extension to the harbour. Eyemouth Harbour caters for most types of fishery activity and as a result Eyemouth's primary industry has seen a certain amount of rejuvenation. A pontoon has been installed in the harbour to provide ease of boarding for seafarers. Volunteers for Her Majesty's Coastguard and the seagoing RNLI lifeboat are called out by the firing of maroons, one for the Coastguard and two for the Lifeboat.

There is a boatyard which carries out works to fishing and commercial vessels. The new harbour and fish market has toilets and showers which are available to visiting seamen – contact the Eyemouth Harbour Harbourmaster. The visitor centre explains the methods of fishing, the types of nets and the vessels used and examples of the equipment of a typical fishing boat are displayed. Visitors can see the market in action in the early mornings from a viewing platform. Boats are available for hire for sea fishing, sightseeing and diving in one of the few marine reserves in Britain.

The Eyemouth pale is a cold-smoked haddock, distinct from varieties such as Finnan haddock by its lighter, golden hue, and subtler smoked flavour, achieved by a shorter smoking time.

Politics
The elected Eyemouth Town Community Council is led by a Chairman and has 12 members including an Honorary Provost. Three representatives of Scottish Borders Council attend monthly public meetings in order to take on board and act upon feedback from the community councillors who serve as a voice of the people of the town. Eyemouth Town Community Council (a Scottish Community Council), meets on the last Monday of the month (except in December) at 7.00pm in the community centre, minutes of the meetings being displayed on their website, on two notice boards in the town and also in the Berwickshire News.

Attractions 

The wide sandy bay is flanked by high cliffs. Despite being sheltered by Hurkur Rocks, storms can generate high waves and throw high plumes of spume into the air over the sea wall. It is named "The Bantry", said to be in affectionate memory of the Irish labourers from the fishing town of that name in County Cork who constructed it.

The 18 hole golf course and clubhouse have sea views and a restaurant which is open to the public, allowing patrons to enjoy panoramic views as they eat.

Divers come from all over the world to enjoy the St Abbs and Eyemouth Voluntary Marine Reserve with its unique marine flora and fauna.

Eyemouth also has a great leisure centre consisting of a state-of-the-art gym, studio, a sauna and two swimming pools, one small with a maximum depth of less than 3 feet and a big pool with minimum depth of 3 feet to a maximum depth of 10 feet.

Nearby places of interest
Other places of interest nearby include the fortifications of Berwick-upon-Tweed also designed by Sir Richard Lee, and its military museum, Paxton House, the Union Bridge and the Chain Bridge Honey Farm, and scores of quiet country roads skirting the Cheviot Hills, frequently snow-capped in winter. Many visitors pause on their journey on the A1 to photograph their arrival in Scotland or their departure to England at the border crossing. Though the border has significance to many visitors, most residents of Eyemouth consider themselves Scottish rather than British. Nearby the border is a nature trail through the mysteriously named 'Conundrum' Farm. Typical Border towns and villages, such as Kelso, Grantshouse, Abbey St Bathans, Cove, Cockburnspath (pronounced 'coburnspath' or 'copath' by locals), Cornhill, Wooler, Morpeth, Alnmouth and Alnwick are all within easy reach for day trips from Eyemouth. Near Chirnside stood Ninewells House, since demolished, where Scottish Enlightenment philosopher David Hume spent much of his life.

Popular culture
ITV's Taggart was filmed on occasion at St Abbs and Coldingham Sands.
Eyemouth is the setting for a novel by Susanna Kearsley titled The Shadowy Horses.
Eyemouth is the home of the Queen of the Underworld in H.P. Mallory's series of Jolie Wilkins books.
Avengers Endgame was filmed at nearby, featuring St Abbs as the harbour town of New Asgard and the overlooking cliffs where Thor asks Valkyrie to be King.

See also
List of places in the Scottish Borders

Notes

References
Rev. Daniel McIver, An old-time fishing town – Eyemouth, John Menzies, 1906.

Peter Aitchison, Children of the Sea: The Story of the People of Eyemouth, Tuckwell Press Ltd, 2001. Republished ?2007 as Black Friday. (The author is a descendant of William Spears.)

External links 
Eyemouth Town Community Council

Eyemouth Chamber of Trade
St Abbs and Eyemouth Voluntary Marine Reserve
The Great Disaster and the Eyemouth Tapestry
The 1881 Disaster Memorials
Historic photographs of Eyemouth showing life and work in past ages.
 
History of Netherbyres House

 
Towns in the Scottish Borders
Ports and harbours of Scotland
Port cities and towns of the North Sea
Berwickshire
Parishes in Berwickshire
Burghs
Fishing communities in Scotland
Surfing locations in Scotland
Underwater diving sites in Scotland
Populated coastal places in Scotland